James Henry Dolphin (28 August 1918 – 20 July 2006) was an Australian rules footballer who played with Footscray in the Victorian Football League (VFL).	

After playing for Footscray, Dolphin enlisted in the Australian Army and served in World War II.

Notes

External links 

1918 births
2006 deaths
Australian rules footballers from Melbourne
Western Bulldogs players
Australian Army personnel of World War II
People from Moonee Ponds, Victoria
Military personnel from Melbourne